Hirapur may refer to:

 Hirapur, Balaghat, a census town in Balaghat, Madhya Pradesh, India
 Hirapur (Assembly constituency), an assembly constituency in West Bengal, India
 Hirapur, Uttar Pradesh, a village in Ambedkar Nagar, Uttar Pradesh, India
 Hirapur, Khurda, a village in Bhubaneswar, Odisha, India
 Hirpora, a village in Jammu and Kashmir
 a neighbourhood of Dhanbad in the Indian state of Jharkhand; see Dhanbad Municipal Corporation